Wardley may refer to:

Organisations
Wardley (company), a fish food manufacturer
Wardley, a former merchant banking division of The Hongkong and Shanghai Banking Corporation

People
John Wardley (born 1950), English concept designer and developer of theme parks
Liz Wardley (born 1980), Papua New Guinean skipper
Niky Wardley, English actress
Stanley Wardley, English city engineer
Stuart Wardley (born 1974), English footballer

Places in England
Wardley, Gateshead, Tyne and Wear
Wardley, Rutland
Wardley, Greater Manchester
Wardley, West Sussex, a U.K. location

See also
Wardley map, a method for organizational strategy invented by Simon Wardley